myGRAIN is a melodic death metal band from Helsinki, Finland. They were signed to Spinefarm Records. They released five studio albums.

Background
myGRAIN formed in 2004. The band roster was Tommy Tuovinen (vocals), Resistor (rhythm guitar), Jonas (bass), and Matthew (guitar) from their former band, New Science Band.

DJ Locomotive (drums) and Eve Kojo (keyboards) joined the band prior to the record deal with Spinefarm Records.

The band produced two self-financed demos. The second, The Red Frame, resulted in a record deal with Spinefarm Records.

They released their debut album Orbit Dance in April 2006. The debut album consisted of eleven songs of modern metal – demonstrating both Nordic and American melodic death metal in its song construction. The band toured heavily in Finland to promote the release of Orbit Dance. During this time they continued to record new songs and in February 2008 they released their second album Signs of Existence. On January 12, 2011, myGRAIN released their self-titled album. In the beginning of 2013 they announced new album Planetary Breathing, to release in April. A little later the album was pushed back by 5 months to September due to disagreements with their label.

The band broke up in May 2015 on Facebook saying "All this has taken its toll on the band and for a long time, especially after all the problems we had with the release of “Planetary Breathing”, we have struggled with the question whether we still have the fire and the strength to go on...we will most definitely continue making music in our separate projects."

A new post appeared on the myGRAIN Facebook page on October 26, 2018, with a YouTube link to a new myGRAIN song called "Lightless".  It was one of 3 new tracks that was released on the EP, III in November 2018. It was followed by the album V in 2020.

Discography

Studio albums
 Orbit Dance (2006)
 Signs of Existence (2008)
 myGRAIN (2011)
 Planetary Breathing (2013)
 III (2018)
 V (2020)

Demos
 Demo 2004 (2004)
 The Red Frame (2005)

Members

Current members
Tommy "To(mm)yboy" Tuovinen - vocals (2004-2015, 2018–present)
Joni Lahdenkauppi - rhythm guitar (2013-2015, 2018–present)
Teemu "Mr. Downhill" Ylämäki - lead guitar (2008-2015, 2018–present) (Misery Inc.)
Jonas Kuhlberg - bass (2004-2015, 2018–present)
Janne "DJ Locomotive" Mikael Manninen - drums (2004-2015, 2018–present) (...And Oceans)

Former Members
Matthew - lead guitar (2004-2008)
Resistor - rhythm guitar (2004-2013)
Eve Kojo - keyboards (2004-2015, 2018–2019)

Timeline

References

External links

 Encyclopaedia Metallum
 Official Website
 Spinefarm Website
 Myspace Page

Musical groups established in 2004
Finnish melodic death metal musical groups
Musical groups from Helsinki
Musical groups disestablished in 2015